In optical burst switching, offset time is the time between the burst header/control packet. The offset time used in one-way reservation schemes  allows the network time to schedule the burst and set-up resources prior to burst arrival is sent into the network. The offset time can be varied to allow the network time to configure based on the information carried in the burst header packet.
By varying the offset time, different levels of quality of service can be provided.

Fiber-optic communications